Jewells is a suburb of the City of Lake Macquarie, Greater Newcastle in New South Wales, Australia  from Newcastle's central business district on the eastern side of Lake Macquarie and north-east of the town of Belmont.

History 
The suburb was named for John Jewell, who used to lead hunting parties in Jewells Swamp, which was home to waterfowl, kangaroo and emu. The swamp and Jewells Beach were used for a commando training course in World War II. The land was subdivided in the 1920s along with Belmont North and Floraville, but wasn't developed until the 1970s. A public school opened in 1977 and the local shopping centre opened in 1982.

References

External links
 History of Jewells (Lake Macquarie City Library)

Suburbs of Lake Macquarie